Finswimming at the 2007 Asian Indoor Games was held in Macau Olympic Aquatic Centre, Macau, China from 27 October to 28 October 2007. The competition included only surface events.

Medalists

Men

Women

Medal table

Results

Men

50 m
27 October

100 m
27 October

200 m
28 October

4 × 100 m relay
28 October

Women

50 m
27 October

100 m
27 October

200 m
28 October

4 × 100 m relay
28 October

References
 2007 Asian Indoor Games official website

2007 Asian Indoor Games events
Asian Indoor Games
Finswimming at multi-sport events